is a West Japan Railway Company (JR West) railway station located in Shimonoseki, Yamaguchi, Japan.

History
 1 October 1935: Kajikuri Station opens. (At different location)
 10 August 1941: Kajikuri Station closes.
 15 March 2008: Kajikuri-Gōdaichi Station opens.

Layout
The station consists of one side platform serving a single track, and is unstaffed.

Adjacent stations

References

External links
 Kajikuri-Gōdaichi Station information (jr-odekake.net) 

Railway stations in Japan opened in 2008
Railway stations in Yamaguchi Prefecture
Sanin Main Line
Stations of West Japan Railway Company